King of the Cage (KOTC) is a mixed martial arts (MMA) promotion based in Southern California, United States.

History
KOTC was founded in 1998 by Terry Trebilcock. KOTC features mostly amateur as well as up and coming MMA stars and former mainstream combat fighters.

KOTC has promoted a majority of its events at Native American casinos throughout the United States.  KOTC also promotes events in Canada, Australia & Japan.  King of The Cage events are also broadcast on most national pay-per-view platforms. The Cage Announcer for KOTC is Pete Trevino.
 
In September 2007, Trebilcock sold KOTC to ProElite.  Two years later, in July 2009, he reacquired 100% ownership of KOTC and simultaneously entered into a joint venture agreement with Mark Burnett Productions ("Survivor", "Apprentice", "Celebrity Apprentice" and "The Contender") to begin the development of a reality television program.  Bully Beatdown, a Burnett produced program, aired three seasons on MTV and featured several KOTC competitors.

On January 30, 2010, it was announced that KOTC would begin airing monthly shows on Mark Cuban's HDNet channel.  The initial deal was for 36 events to air. The announcers included Michael Schiavello, Jason "Mayhem" Miller and Maria Kanellis. The most recent event on HDNet aired on September 17, 2010 with No Mercy. There has been no further news regarding King of the Cage events on the channel. Only 6 events aired from February 2010 to September 2010.

In November 2012, MAVTV struck a 5-year deal with King of the Cage.

On July 2, 2019 it was reported that the King of the Cage president, Terry Trebilcock, refused to release Drako Rodriguez who was offered to replaced Sean O'Malley for the bout against Marlon Vera at UFC 239.

Current champions
The weight division system of KOTC is in accordance with the Unified Rules of Mixed Martial Arts, but KOTC names its 145-pound division Bantamweight (instead of Featherweight), its 135-pound division Flyweight (instead of Bantamweight) and its 125-pound division Light Flyweight (instead of Flyweight). The only three weight classes not in accordance with the Unified Rules are a 165-pound division (Light Welterweight), a 195-pound division (Super Middleweight), and a 230-pound division (Cruiserweight).

See also 
List of KOTC events
List of King of the Cage champions
Yearly event Wikipedia pages: 
1999 in King of the Cage
2000 in King of the Cage
2001 in King of the Cage
2002 in King of the Cage
2003 in King of the Cage
2004 in King of the Cage
2005 in King of the Cage
2006 in King of the Cage
2007 in King of the Cage
2008 in King of the Cage
2009 in King of the Cage
2010 in King of the Cage
2011 in King of the Cage

References

External links 
King of the Cage Official website
KOTC event results at Sherdog
KOTC Canada event results at Sherdog
Dean Stone Official website

Mixed martial arts organizations
Sports organizations of the United States
Organizations based in California
Sports organizations established in 1998